The 2022 Florida Gators football team represented the University of Florida in the 2022 NCAA Division I FBS football season. The Gators played their home games at Ben Hill Griffin Stadium in Gainesville, Florida, and competed in the Eastern Division of the Southeastern Conference (SEC). They were led by first-year head coach Billy Napier.

Previous season

After a 2020 season in which Florida spent most of year ranked among the top ten in the AP Poll, the Gators began the 2021 season with a No. 13 ranking and expectations of again being a serious contender for a conference championship. However, a series of upset losses, historically poor defensive showings, and apparent discontent within the program resulted in a losing record and the dismissal of fourth year head coach Dan Mullen with one game remaining in the regular season. Assistant Greg Knox led the Gators on an interim basis in their win over rival Florida State and their loss against UCF in the Gasparilla Bowl to wrap up a disappointing 6–7 campaign. Louisiana head coach Billy Napier was named Florida's new head coach on November 28, 2021.

Schedule

Game summaries

No. 7 Utah

No. 20 Kentucky

South Florida

No. 11 Tennessee

No. 20 Eastern Washington (FCS)

Missouri

LSU

No. 1 Georgia

Texas A&M

South Carolina

Vanderbilt

No. 16 Florida State

No. 14 Oregon State

Rankings

Personnel

Roster

Coaching staff

Notes and references

Florida
Florida Gators football seasons
Florida Gators football